The 1999 WNBA season was the second for the Detroit Shock. The Shock entered the playoffs for the first time in franchise history.

Offseason

WNBA Draft

Regular season

Season standings

Season schedule

Playoffs

Player stats

References

External links
Shock on Basketball Reference

Detroit Shock seasons
Detroit
Detroit Shock